is a railway station in the town of  Tomioka, Fukushima, Japan, operated by the East Japan Railway Company (JR East).

Lines
Yonomori Station is served by the Jōban Line, and is located 253.0 km from the official starting point of the line at Nippori Station.

Station layout
The station has one island platform with an elevated station  building. The station is unattended.

History
Yonomori Station was opened on 15 March 1921. The station was absorbed into the JR East network upon the privatization of the Japanese National Railways (JNR) on 1 April 1987. The station was closed on March 11, 2011, following the Fukushima Daiichi nuclear disaster, and was reopened on December 18, 2019, after rebuilding.

Surrounding area
Yonomori is within the evacuation zone surrounding the Fukushima Daiichi Nuclear Power Plant. Since August 2012 it has been possible to enter the area to the west of the station, but remaining in the area overnight is prohibited. The station and the area to the east of the station remain off limits at all times due to high radiation levels. It reopened along with the rest of the exclusion zone on March 14, 2020.

 Yonomori Post Office

References

External links

 JR East Station Information 

Railway stations in Fukushima Prefecture
Jōban Line
Railway stations in Japan opened in 1921
Tomioka, Fukushima